Sami bin Khamis bin Salih Essid
a.k.a. Essid Sami Ben Khemais was the head of al-Qaeda's Italian cell until his arrest outside Milan in April 2001. He received a five-year sentence for trafficking in arms, explosives, and chemicals. Essid remains under embargo by the United Nations Security Council Committee 1267 as an affiliate of al-Qaeda, and by the US Treasury for his terrorist activity. Around 1 July 2007, fresh charges against Sami Essid were read in Italy, where he was still in custody.

According to the UN he was born on 10 February 1968 in Menzel Jemil, Bizerte Governorate, Tunisia.

He phoned a cell phone held by Saber Mohammed - believed to have been acting as a messenger for Mosa Zi Zemmori and Driss Elatellah.

Guantanamo connection
Following the United States Supreme Court ruling in Rasul v. Bush, the United States Department of Defense was forced to conduct reviews of the combatant status of the captives held in extrajudicial detention in its Guantanamo Bay detainment camps, in Cuba.

The allegations that Guantanamo counter-terror analysts offered to justify the detention of several of these captives assert that they had an association with Sami Essid, or the Sami Essid Network.

References

1968 births
Living people
Tunisian al-Qaeda members
People designated by the Al-Qaida and Taliban Sanctions Committee
Islamic terrorism in Italy
People from Bizerte Governorate